Sir Maurice Berkeley (1358–1400) was the member of Parliament for the constituency of Gloucestershire for the parliament of 1391.

References 

Members of the Parliament of England for Gloucestershire
English MPs 1391
1358 births
1400 deaths
English knights